Saint-Timothée is a former municipality located in the Montérégie region of Quebec, Canada, on Île-de-Salaberry in the St. Lawrence River. It occupied the middle third and largest area of the island, which is part of the Hochelaga Archipelago. The municipality is flanked by the cities of Beauharnois to the east, and to the west by Salaberry-de-Valleyfield, which Saint-Timothée was merged with on January 1, 2002.

See also
 2000–2006 municipal reorganization in Quebec

References

Communities in Montérégie
Former municipalities in Quebec
Salaberry-de-Valleyfield
Populated places disestablished in 2002